USS Rio Grande (AOG-3) was a in service with the United States Navy from 1943–1946 and 1950–1956. She was scrapped in 1972.

World War II service  
Gasoline tanker Rio Grande was laid down 30 June 1942 by Seattle-Tacoma Shipbuilding Corporation, Seattle, Washington; launched 23 September 1942; sponsored by Mrs. R. D. Kirkpatrick; and commissioned 10 April 1943.

Following shakedown Rio Grande was assigned to the U.S. Pacific Fleet as a unit of the mobile support group and carried petroleum products to help provide the lifeline of fuel for the fighting ships of the fleet in their advance toward Japan. After the end of World War II, she continued to operate with Service Force, Pacific Fleet until she decommissioned 28 June 1946.

Post-war activity  
In April 1948, she was transferred to Norfolk, Virginia, and placed in the Atlantic Reserve Fleet.

Reactivated during Korean War 
Rio Grande recommissioned 12 October 1950. Early the next year she resumed her mission of providing petroleum logistic support in the mid-Pacific. In September 1952 she began seven months of service in the western Pacific, supplying gasoline and diesel oil to United Nations forces in Japan and Korea, with an occasional run to French Indochina. She returned to Pearl Harbor in May 1953 and resumed her fueling duties there. The following March she sailed for Alaskan waters and seven weeks of service transporting fuel between Shemya Island and the Alaskan mainland before returning to the mid-Pacific.

Decommissioning  
Rio Grande decommissioned at San Diego, California, 6 January 1956. On 30 June 1960 she entered the Maritime Administration Reserve Fleet at Puget Sound, Olympia, Washington, where she remained until sold for scrapping on 7 February 1972 to General Metals, Tacoma, Washington. Her bell is located in the navy wing of the ROTC building at Texas A&M University.

Military awards and honors 
Rio Grande’s Navy crew members were eligible for the following medals:
 China Service Medal (extended)
 American Campaign Medal
 Asiatic-Pacific Campaign Medal
 World War II Victory Medal
 Navy Occupation Service Medal (with Asia clasp)
 National Defense Service Medal
 Korean Service Medal
 United Nations Service Medal
 Republic of Korea War Service Medal (retroactive)

References

External links 
 NavSource Online: Service Ship Photo Archive - AOG-3 Rio Grande

 

Patapsco-class gasoline tankers
Ships built in Seattle
1942 ships
World War II auxiliary ships of the United States
Korean War auxiliary ships of the United States